Giovanni Gronchi,  (10 September 1887 – 17 October 1978) was an Italian politician from Christian Democracy who served as the president of Italy from 1955 to 1962 and was marked by a controversial and failed attempt to bring about an "opening to the left" in Italian politics.
He was reputed the real holder of the executive power in Italy from 1955 to 1962, behind the various Prime Ministers of this time.

Biography

Early life and political career
He was born at Pontedera, Tuscany, and was an early member of the Christian Movement founded by the Catholic priest don Romolo Murri in 1902.  He obtained his first degree in literature and philosophy at the Scuola Normale Superiore di Pisa. Between 1911 and 1915 he then worked as a high-school teacher of classics in several Italian towns (Parma, Massa di Carrara, Bergamo and Monza).

He volunteered for military service in the First World War and when it was over he became in 1919 one of the founding members of the Catholic Italian Popular Party. He was elected to represent Pisa in both the parliamentary elections of 1919 and 1921. A trade-union leader in the Italian Confederation of Christian Workers, in 1922–1923 he served in the first government of Benito Mussolini as Under-secretary for Industry and Commerce. In April 1923, however, a national meeting of the Popular Party held in Turin decided to withdraw all PPI representatives from the government. He then went back to his role in the leadership of the Catholic trade unions, and tried to face the daily violence brought against them by the fascist squads.

In 1924, after Luigi Sturzo had resigned as Secretary of the PPI, Gronchi became leader of the party, together with two other "triumvirs", (Spataro and Rodinò). Re-elected to Parliament in the same year, he joined the anti-fascist opposition of the so-called Aventine Secession (from the hill in Rome where the opposition withdrew from Parliament). In 1926 he was expelled from Parliament by the new regime.

In the years between 1925 and 1943 he thus interrupted his political career. In order to avoid having to become a member of the Fascist Party, he also resigned his position as a schoolteacher, and earned his living as a successful businessman, first as a salesman and then as an industrialist.

After the Second World War
In 1943–1944 he was a co-founder of the new Christian-Democratic party (DC), and became a leader of its left-wing faction, together with men like Giorgio La Pira, Giuseppe Dossetti and Enrico Mattei (the future boss of ENI, the Italian government-owned petrochemical giant). He was also a member of the Comitato di Liberazione Nazionale, the multi-party committee of the Italian Resistance, as a representative of his party.

Although often in conflict with his party's majority and its Secretary Alcide De Gasperi, he served as Industry minister in 1944–1946 and as a member of the Constituent Assembly in 1946. In 1947, as the Cold War began, he vehemently opposed his party's decision to expel the Italian Communist and Socialist parties from the national government. From 1948 to 1955 he was elected President of the Italian Chamber of Deputies (the lower branch of Parliament).

President (1955–1962)

In 1955 Luigi Einaudi's term as first President of the Italian Republic came to an end, and Parliament had to choose his successor. The new Secretary of the DC, Amintore Fanfani, was promoting for the job the liberal Cesare Merzagora, who was then President of the Senate. However the extreme right-wing of the party – led by Giuseppe Pella, Guido Gonella, Salvatore Scoca and Giulio Andreotti – joined hands with the trade-unionist left – led by Giovanni Pastore, Giorgio Bo and Achille Marazza – in an "uprising" against the party leadership, in order to get Giovanni Gronchi ("Parliament's man") elected instead. The move had the support of the Communist and Socialist parties, and also of the monarchic and neo-fascist right. After a bitter battle and the final crumbling of the centrist front, on 29 April 1955 Gronchi was elected President of the Republic with 658 votes out of 883. He was the first Catholic politician to become Head of the Italian State.

His period in office lasted until 1962. It was marked by the ambition to bring about a gradual "opening to the left", whereby the Socialists and the Communist Party would be brought back into the national government, and Italy would abandon NATO, becoming a non-aligned country. There was however stiff parliamentary opposition to this project, particularly by the small Italian Liberal Party, which was deemed a necessary ingredient of any viable majority.

In an attempt to escape the deadlock, in 1959 Gronchi appointed as prime minister a trusted member of his own Catholic left-wing faction, Fernando Tambroni, sending him to Parliament with a "President’s government" but no pre-arranged majority. However Tambroni found himself surviving in Parliament only thanks to neo-fascist votes. This unforeseen "opening to the right" had serious consequences. In 1960 there were bad riots in several towns of Italy, particularly at Genoa, Licata and Reggio Emilia, where the police opened fire on demonstrators, killing five people. The Tambroni government thus ended in ignominy; forced to resign, it was followed by an all-DC government, with a traditionally centrist parliamentary majority.

The unhappy Tambroni experiment tarnished Gronchi's reputation for good, and until the end of his period of office he remained a lame-duck President. In 1962 he attempted to get a second mandate, with the powerful help of Enrico Mattei, but the attempt failed and Antonio Segni was elected instead. As he ceased to be Head of State, he became a life senator by right, according to the Italian Constitution. He died in Rome on 17 October 1978 at the age of 91.

Assessment
For an overall historical assessment of his presidency, it must be kept in mind the Tambroni failure, with its suggestion of an authoritarian approach. An "opening to the left" of sorts happened soon after his mandate was over; the first centre-left coalition was formed by Aldo Moro as soon as 1964, when the Socialists (but not the Communists) entered the government. In the 1970s, the Christian Democrats and Communists made efforts toward what was called the Historic Compromise. On this basis he might be credited with some important foresight and a lasting influence. Still, it is hard to maintain that his political project had really very much to do with the center-left governments that followed each other between 1964 and 1992. During most of this period the Communists were isolated even more tightly than before, due to the loss of their former Socialist allies and the bitter conflict that followed with them, particularly after Bettino Craxi became the Socialist leader.  Outside influences were later revealed to be at work as well.  A 2000 Parliament Commission report concluded that the strategy and operations by the clandestine, US-supported, "stay-behind" Gladio was designed to "stop the PCI, and to a certain degree also the PSI [Italian Socialist Party], from achieving executive power in the country".  In any case, Italy kept its socio-economic structure as a market economy and its foreign policy alignment.

Personal life
In 1941, Gronchi married Carla Bissatini (2 September 1912 – 14 August 1993) and had one son and one daughter.

In the Florestano Vancini's film The Assassination of Matteotti (1973), Gronchi is played by Giorgio Favretto.

Electoral history

Presidential elections

See also 
 Gronchi Rosa

References

External links
Quirinale (Italian)

Books
 (it) Igino Giordani, Alcide De Gasperi il ricostruttore, Rome: Edizioni Cinque Lune, 1955.
 (it) Giulio Andreotti, De Gasperi e il suo tempo, Milan: Mondadori, 1956.
Paul Ginsborg, A History of Contemporary Italy, Penguin Books, 1990 (lengthy account of post-war events in Italy from a rather heavily biased left-wing point of view; Gronchi's election and its peculiar political circumstances are not covered; the Tambroni affair is narrated, but Gronchi's role in it is glossed over).
 (it) Indro Montanelli and Mario Cervi, L'Italia del Novecento, Rizzoli, 1998 (in Italian; a somewhat journalistic account of  twentieth-century Italy, from a liberal point of view).
 (it) S. Bertelli (ed.) Scritti e discorsi su Giovanni Gronchi a vent'anni dalla morte (1998), Giardini, 2000 (in Italian; mostly eulogies by old friends).
 (it) Nico Perrone, Il segno della DC, Bari: Dedalo Libri, 2002, .

1887 births
1978 deaths
People from Pontedera
Italian Roman Catholics
Italian People's Party (1919) politicians
Christian Democracy (Italy) politicians
Presidents of Italy
Government ministers of Italy
Deputies of Legislature XXV of the Kingdom of Italy
Deputies of Legislature XXVI of the Kingdom of Italy
Deputies of Legislature XXVII of the Kingdom of Italy
Members of the Constituent Assembly of Italy
Presidents of the Chamber of Deputies (Italy)
Deputies of Legislature I of Italy
Deputies of Legislature II of Italy
Bonomi II Cabinet
Bonomi III Cabinet
Italian life senators
Politicians of Tuscany
People expelled from public office
University of Pisa alumni
Italian military personnel of World War I
Grand Crosses Special Class of the Order of Merit of the Federal Republic of Germany
Honorary Knights Grand Cross of the Order of the Bath
Italian Aventinian secessionists